Wallace Frost (October 27, 1892 – June 24, 1962) was an American architect.

Early life
Frost was born in Uniontown, Pennsylvania. He studied architecture with Paul Cret at the University of Pennsylvania.

World War I
During the war, Frost designed hangars for military installations in Washington, D.C. at the Naval Air Force. While he was there, he met Detroit architect Albert Kahn. Kahn asked Frost to come to Michigan to work with him and Frost moved there in 1919.

Career
Frost settled in Birmingham, Michigan in 1921 and worked with Albert Kahn. In 1926 he started his own practice and mostly designed homes in the Detroit suburbs. Frost designed 44 houses in or near Birmingham and he is also famous for designing the Michigan Governor's Mansion. He is known for midsize cottage houses that are flooded with natural light and that feature woodwork, architectural details and limestone frames around windows and doors. Frost created a Birmingham house for himself at 579 Tooting Lane in 1921. People who lived in houses he built often called them "Wally" houses. A number of them are near Quarton Lake and in the Holy Name neighborhood.

Frost worked in Europe in 1932 and 1933 and then worked from 1933 until 1938 in Southern California. He built his own large home in Montecito, California in 1936. He returned to Birmingham in 1939 and practiced until 1961. In 2005, basketball star Chris Webber purchased a 1927 Wallace Frost mansion in Grosse Pointe Park. As Webber said about the purchase, "I'm a lover of history and a Wallace Frost fan and I was completely blown away by this house."

Birmingham homes
In August 1992, the Historic District and Design Review Commission published a report titled "Wallace Frost: His Architecture in Birmingham, Michigan." The report includes a list of homes in Birmingham that were designed by Frost.

Family life
Frost married Grace Bierer in 1917. They had one son, Jon, born in 1920 (d. 2002). Wallace Frost died in 1962, of a heart attack at the age of 69.

References

1892 births
20th-century American architects
1962 deaths
Architects from Michigan
People from Uniontown, Pennsylvania
University of Pennsylvania School of Design alumni